is a retired Japanese judoka who is a professor at Tenri University.

Biography
Masaki began judo during elementary school, and graduated from Tenri Highschool and Tenri University, where he was awarded as an outstanding competitor at the All-Japan Collegiate Judo Championships four times. Yasuhiro Yamashita, Seigo Saito, Yasuyuki Muneta, and Yohei Takai are the only other judoka in history who received the award four times. Masaki continued to work and train at the university after graduating, but was unable to gain a spot on the Japanese national judo team as the third-string competitor behind Yasuhiro Yamashita and Hitoshi Saito. However, when Saito entered in both the +95 kg and Open weight categories of the 1985 World Judo Championships, he was severely injured in the final of the +95 kg competition, forcing him to give up his spot in the Open weight category. Masaki filled in as a last-minute replacement, and defeated Mohamed Rashwan in the final to become world champion in the Open weight category. He continued his success with consecutive wins at the All-Japan Judo Championships from 1986 to 1987, and was scheduled to enter the 1987 World Judo Championships but withdrew due to an injury (his replacement, 19-year-old Naoya Ogawa, went on to win the tournament to become the youngest world champion at the time). Though seen as the favorite to represent Japan in the Open weight category at the 1988 Summer Olympics, Masaki was defeated by Naoya Ogawa and Hitoshi Saito in qualification tournaments and did not make an appearance at the Olympics.

Masaki has continued to work for Tenri University after retiring, both as a judo instructor and a professor in sports science. He has also worked as an instructor for the All-Japan Judo Federation.

See also
 List of judoka

References

External links
 

1962 births
Living people
Japanese male judoka
Sportspeople from Osaka Prefecture
Asian Games medalists in judo
Judoka at the 1986 Asian Games
Asian Games gold medalists for Japan
Medalists at the 1986 Asian Games
Universiade medalists in judo
People from Tadaoka, Osaka
Universiade gold medalists for Japan
Medalists at the 1985 Summer Universiade
20th-century Japanese people
21st-century Japanese people